Vampire Cop Ricky is a 2006 South Korean film.

Plot 
A mosquito from Transylvania finds its way to Seoul where it bites Na Do-yol, a corrupt police officer. Soon after he begins to develop a thirst for blood, and finds out that he has vampire super powers whenever he becomes sexually aroused. When Do-yol's past misdeeds come back to threaten his partner and girlfriend, he decides to clean up his act and sets out for revenge.

Cast 
 Kim Su-ro ... Na Do-yol
 Jo Yeo-jeong
 Chun Ho-jin
 Son Byong-ho ... Tak Moon-su
 Oh Kwang-rok ... Vampire Hunter
 Kim Goo-taek
 Lee Sang-hong
 Oh Soon-tae

Release 
Vampire Cop Ricky was released in South Korea on 9 February 2006, and on its opening weekend topped the box office with 492,272 admissions. The film went on to receive a total of 1,858,668 admissions nationwide, with a gross (as of 12 March 2006) of $10,671,848.

See also
Vampire film

References

External links 
 
 
 

2006 films
2006 action films
South Korean action comedy films
South Korean fantasy films
2000s action comedy films
2000s superhero films
Vampire comedy films
Films set in Seoul
2000s Korean-language films
Showbox films
2006 comedy films
2000s South Korean films